Mohammadpur Preparatory School and College is an education institution located in Mohammadpur, Dhaka. The institution has separate campus facility for male and female students. It has two systems of education: Bengali medium and English version. It has two shifts MORNING and DAY. Morning shift starts at 8:00 am and ends at 12:00 pm.Day shift starts at 1:00 pm and ends at 5:30 pm. It was established in 1976. Students from this institution appears in PEC, JSC, SSC and HSC public examinations. The school curriculum includes traditional secondary and higher secondary school academic subjects assigned by Dhaka Education Board and co-curricular activities. The music team of this institution has consecutively gained the first place twice in 2018 and 2019 among all institutions in Bangladesh in the national anthem competition in pure tune.

References

External links
 School website

Schools in Dhaka District
Colleges in Dhaka District
Private colleges in Bangladesh
High schools in Bangladesh